Gunnar Lennartsson Wåhlberg (27 July 1910 – 9 October 1995) was a Swedish skier. He competed in the military patrol at the 1936 Summer Olympics.

References

1910 births
1995 deaths
Sportspeople from Umeå
Swedish military patrol (sport) runners
Military patrol competitors at the 1936 Winter Olympics
Winter Olympics competitors for Sweden